"Folding Stars" is a song by Scottish band Biffy Clyro from their 2007 album, Puzzle. It was released as the third physical single from Puzzle, on 16 July 2007 and reached number 18 on the UK Singles Chart.

Overview
"Folding Stars" was inspired by the death of Simon Neil's mother, Eleanor, in March 2004. The song has been described as a "huge, hands-in-the-air anthem", "the album’s finest heart-on-sleeve moment" and "raw, honest and breathtaking".

Simon Neil has commented on the song, saying:

The song was first performed live on 8 July 2007, at the Radio 1/NME Stage at T in the Park 2007. Mike Vennart of Oceansize, a long-time friend of the band, provided second guitar for this performance. On 26 August 2007, the band played at Leeds Festival and stated that it was the last time that Folding Stars would be played live. They however reneged on this decision when the song was played live at Brixton Academy on 21 November 2007. An acoustic version of this song was performed by Simon on his own at their Wembley Arena show in 2010. It was played again by the band on BBC Radio 1 Live Lounge on 19 August 2013, and later as part of the band's headline performances at Reading and Leeds festivals, 25 and 23 August, respectively. Simon Neil later played the song on 3 April 2020 as part of a Facebook live session in the coronavirus lockdown.

The physical release of the single topped the UK Physical Singles Chart, while the single overall peaked at number 18 on the UK Singles Chart.

Music video
The song's official music video was directed by Howard Greenhalgh and filmed at Painshill, a landscape park in Surrey. It features the band playing at various locations in the park, including the Gothic Temple, Abbey and Crystal Grotto.

Track listing
Music and lyrics by Simon Neil. 
 CD 14FLR24CD
"Folding Stars" – 4:15
"Asexual Meat Kitchen" - 3:29
 7" #1 14FLR24V1
"Folding Stars" – 4:15
"Coward" - 3:40
 7" #2 14FLR24V2
"Folding Stars" – 4:15
"A Headline" - 3:39
 Digital download
"Folding Stars" – 3:56
 iTunes exclusive
"Folding Stars (Demo)" - 4:30

Personnel
 Simon Neil – guitar, vocals
 James Johnston – bass, vocals
 Ben Johnston – drums, vocals
 Garth Richardson – producer

Charts

References

External links
 "Folding Stars" Lyrics
 "Folding Stars" Guitar Tablature

Biffy Clyro songs
2007 singles
Albums with cover art by Storm Thorgerson
Songs written by Simon Neil
Song recordings produced by Garth Richardson
Commemoration songs
Music videos directed by Howard Greenhalgh
2007 songs